David Dayan Fisher is an English actor from London, England. He is known for his frequent portrayal of antagonistic characters, as well as his deep voice.

He played Michael Sowerby/Raz in The Bill, he has also appeared in The Last Post, National Treasure, NCIS, Robbery Homicide Division, Burn Notice, Charmed, 24, Numb3rs, and Stargate Atlantis, playing Baden in the episode, "The Game." He has been seen as  the recurring character Trent Kort on NCIS. As a voice actor, Fisher provided the voice of Xaldin, a member of Organization XIII, in the Kingdom Hearts video game franchise.

Filmography

Television
 The Bill (1998, 2 episodes) - Michael Sowerby
 Robbery Homicide Division (2002, 1 episode) - Berman 
 Charmed (2005, 1 episode) - Margoyle
 NCIS (2006-2016, 14 episodes) as Trent Kort, CIA
 24 (2006, 3 episodes) Russian terrorist Anton Beresch
 Numb3rs (2006, 1 episode: "Harvest") - Michael Tolchuck
 Stargate Atlantis (2006, episode: "The Game") - Baden 
 Everybody Hates Chris (2006, episode 9) - The Devil
 NCIS: Los Angeles (2010, 1 episode) - Trent Kort, CIA
 Burn Notice (2011, episode: "Hard Out") - Miles Vanderwall

Films
 America Brown (2004) - Diner owner (uncredited)
 The Librarian: Quest for the Spear (2004, TV Movie) - Rhodes
 National Treasure (2004) - Shaw
 Redline (2007) - Godfather
 Tony 5 (2008) - Jacko
 Don't Look Up (2009) - Wadim
 The Dark Knight Rises (2012) - Shoe Shine Man at GSE
 Everlasting (2016) - Maurice
 Like Lambs (2016) - Mr. Drummond

Video games
 The Bard's Tale (2004) - Additional voices (voice, as David Fisher)
 Kingdom Hearts II (2006) - Xaldin (English version, voice)
 Kingdom Hearts II Final Mix (2007) - Xaldin (English version, voice)
 Kingdom Hearts 358/2 Days (2009) - Xaldin (English version, voice)
 Kingdom Hearts Birth by Sleep (2010) - Dilan (English version, voice)
 Kingdom Hearts HD 1.5 Remix (2013) - Xaldin (English version, voice)
 Kingdom Hearts HD 2.5 Remix (2014) - Dilan / Xaldin (English version, voice)

References

External links

English male film actors
English male television actors
English male video game actors
English male voice actors
Male actors from London
Living people
People educated at Mill Hill School
Year of birth missing (living people)
Place of birth missing (living people)